Pseudotsuga  is a genus of evergreen coniferous trees in the family Pinaceae (subfamily Laricoideae).

Common names for species in the genus include Douglas fir, Douglas-fir, Douglas tree, Oregon pine and Bigcone spruce. Pseudotsuga menziesii (Douglas fir proper) is widespread in western North America and is an important source of timber. The number of species has long been debated, but two in western North America and two to four in eastern Asia are commonly acknowledged.

Nineteenth-century botanists had problems in classifying Douglas firs, due to the species' similarity to various other conifers better known at the time; they have at times been classified in Pinus, Picea, Abies, Tsuga, and even Sequoia. Because of their distinctive cones, Douglas firs were finally placed in the new genus Pseudotsuga (meaning "false hemlock") by the French botanist Carrière in 1867.  The genus name has also been hyphenated as Pseudo-tsuga.

Name
The tree takes its English name from David Douglas, the Scottish botanist who first introduced Pseudotsuga menziesii into cultivation at Scone Palace in 1827. Douglas is known for introducing many native American tree species to Europe. The hyphenated form "Douglas-fir" is used by some to indicate that Pseudotsuga species are not true firs, which belong to the genus Abies.

Description
The female cones are pendulous, with persistent scales (unlike true firs), and are distinctive in having a long tridentine (three-pointed) bract that protrudes prominently above each scale (it resembles the back half of a mouse, with two feet and a tail).

Pseudotsuga menziesii var. menziesii has attained heights of 393 feet (120* m). That was the estimated height of the tallest conifer ever well-documented, the Mineral Tree (Mineral, Washington), measured in 1924 by Dr. Richard E. McArdle, former chief of the U.S. Forest Service. Only coast redwood and Eucalyptus regnans reach greater heights based on current knowledge of living trees: 379 and 331 feet (116 and 101* m), respectively.
At Quinault, Washington, is found a collection of the largest Douglas-firs in one area. Quinault Rain Forest hosts the most of the top ten known largest Douglas-firs.

, the largest known Douglas-firs in the world are, by volume:

 Red Creek Tree (Red Creek, SW British Columbia) 
 Queets Fir (Queets River Valley-Olympic National Park) 
 Tichipawa (Quinault Lake Rain Forest-Olympic National Park) 
 Rex (Quinault Lake Rain Forest-Olympic National Park) 
 Ol' Jed (Jedediah Smith Redwoods State Park)

Species and varieties 

By far the best-known is the very widespread and abundant North American species Pseudotsuga menziesii, a taxonomically complex species divided into two major varieties (treated as distinct species or subspecies by some botanists): coast Douglas-fir or "green Douglas-fir", on the Pacific coast; and Rocky Mountain Douglas-fir or "interior Douglas-fir", in the interior west of the continent.  According to some botanists, Rocky Mountain Douglas-fir extends south into Mexico to include all Mexican Douglas-fir populations, whereas others have proposed multiple separate species in Mexico and multiple varieties in the United States.  Morphological and genetic evidence suggest that Mexican Douglas-fir should probably be considered a distinct variety within P. menziesii.

All of the other species are of restricted range and little-known outside of their respective native environments, where they are often rare and of scattered occurrence in mixed forests; all those have unfavorable conservation status.  The taxonomy of the Asian Douglas-firs continues to be disputed, but the most recent taxonomic treatment accepts four species: three Chinese and one Japanese.  The three Chinese species have been variously considered varieties of P. sinensis or broken down into additional species and varieties.  In the current treatment, the Chinese species P. sinensis is further subdivided into two varieties: var. sinensis and var. wilsoniana.

North America
 Pseudotsuga macrocarpa (Vasey) Mayr – bigcone Douglas-fir - southern California
 Pseudotsuga menziesii (Mirb.) Franco - western North America from Alaska to Oaxaca
 Pseudotsuga menziesii var. menziesii – coast Douglas-fir
 Pseudotsuga menziesii var. glauca (Beissn.) Franco – Rocky Mountain Douglas-fir
 Pseudotsuga menziesii var. lindleyana (Roezl) Carrière – Mexican Douglas-fir

Asia
 Pseudotsuga brevifolia W.C.Cheng & L.K.Fu – short-leaf Chinese Douglas-fir
 Pseudotsuga forrestii Craib – Yunnan Douglas-fir
 Pseudotsuga japonica (Shiras.) Beissn. – Japanese Douglas-fir
 Pseudotsuga sinensis Dode – Chinese Douglas-fir
 Pseudotsuga sinensis var. sinensis
 Pseudotsuga sinensis var. wilsoniana  – Taiwan Douglas-fir
 Pseudotsuga sinensis var. gaussenii

Formerly placed in Pseudotsuga
 Keteleeria davidiana (Bertrand) Beissn. (as P. davidiana Bertrand)
 Cathaya argyrophylla (as P. argyrophylla)
 Keteleeria fortunei (as P. fortunei)
 Abies magnifica (as P. magnifica)
 Abies procera (as P. nobilis)

Uses 

Douglas-fir wood is used for structural applications that are required to withstand high loads. It is used extensively in the construction industry. Other examples include its use for homebuilt aircraft such as the RJ.03 IBIS canard. Very often, these aircraft were designed to utilize Sitka spruce, which is becoming increasingly difficult to source in aviation quality grades. Oregon pine is also used in boat building when it is available in long, fairly knot-free lengths. Most timber now comes from plantation forests in North America which are managed to produce faster growing timber with fewer knots. This timber is generally lighter but weaker. Traditionally, Oregon pine was used in mast building due to its ability to resist bending loads without fracturing. This was based on using older native forest wood with a high number of growth rings per inch. This sort of wood is seldom available new but can be sourced from merchants dealing in recycled timber. Native Oregon pine is considerably heavier than Sitka spruce, which is about the same weight as western red cedar, but with far better bending characteristics than cedar. Large-sized Oregon pine, as used in beams, is inclined to split as it dries, like oak, but this does not reduce its strength.

Douglas-fir is one of the most commonly marketed Christmas tree species in the United States, where they are sold alongside firs like noble fir and grand fir. Douglas-fir Christmas trees are usually trimmed to a near perfect cone instead of left to grow naturally like noble and grand firs.

Pests and diseases

Douglas-firs are used as food plants by the larvae of some Lepidoptera species, including autumnal moth, bordered white, engrailed moth, pine beauty and turnip moth. The gelechiids Chionodes abella and Chionodes periculella and the tortrix moth Cydia illutana have been specifically recorded on P. menziesii.

Culture
A California Native American myth explains that each three-ended bract is the tail and two tiny legs of a mouse that hid inside the scales of the tree's cones during forest fires, and the tree was kind enough to be its enduring sanctuary.

A Douglas-fir species, Pseudotsuga menziesii, is the state tree of Oregon.

References

External links

 Gymnosperm Database - Pseudotsuga
 Arboretum de Villardebelle: Images of Pseudotsuga species cones

 
Conifer genera
Forestry in Canada
Forestry in the United States
Taxa named by Élie-Abel Carrière